Basin Reserve is a cricket stadium in the New Zealand city of Wellington. It has hosted international cricket matches since 1930 and is the oldest Test cricket ground in the country still in use, with the first Test match on the ground being played in January 1930 between New Zealand and England. It has hosted men's and women's Test and One Day International (ODI) matches as well as women's Twenty20 International (T20I) matches. , the ground has been venue for 66 Test matches, 45 ODIs and two women's T20I matches.

In cricket, a five-wicket haul (also known as a "five-for" or "fifer") refers to a bowler taking five or more wickets in a single innings. This is regarded as a notable achievement.  there have been 75 five-wicket hauls on the ground, 69 in Test matches and six in ODIs.

The first bowler to take a five-wicket haul on the ground was Frank Woolley, who took seven wickets for 76 runs for England in the ground's first Test match in 1930. Jack Cowie was the first New Zealander to accomplish the feat, doing so in 1949. The best innings bowling figures on the ground were Richard Hadlee's 7/23 taken against India in 1976. The first five-wicket haul in an ODI was taken by Lyn Fullston who took 5/27 for Australia Women against New Zealand in January 1982.

Key

Test match five-wicket hauls

There have been 75 five-wicket hauls taken in Test matches on the ground, 73 in men's Tests and two in women's Tests.

Men's matches

Women's matches

One Day International five-wicket hauls

There have been six five-wicket hauls in ODIs on the ground, one in a women's ODI and five in men's ODIs.

Notes

References

External links
 International five-wicket hauls at Basin Reserve, CricInfo

New Zealand cricket lists
Basin Reserve